Nombre de Jesús is a municipality in the Chalatenango department of El Salvador.

External links
Official site

Municipalities of the Chalatenango Department